Country-wide local elections for seats in municipality and county councils were held throughout Norway on 12 and 13 September 1999. For most places this meant that two elections, the municipal elections and the county elections ran concurrently.

Results

Municipal elections
Results of the 1999 municipal elections. Voter turnout was 60,4%.

County elections
Results of the 1999 county elections. Voter turnout was 56,8%.

References

1999
1999
Norway
1999 in Norway
September 1999 events in Europe